Lewin Brzeski Town Hall - a town hall built in the Classical architectural style in 1838. the building is located in the middle of the Lewin Brzeski Market Square (Rynek), the town hall is currently the seat of the Lewin Brzeski City Council and Gmina Lewin Brzeski authorities.

History

The first town hall in Lewin Brzeski was raised at the beginning of the sixteenth-century. The former town hall was built with a wattle and daub structure, the non-renovated building was damaged in 1799. The current town hall was built in 1838, and remains in its original form.

Gallery

References

Brzeg County
City and town halls in Poland